The Italian campaign of World War II, also called the Liberation of Italy following the German occupation in September 1943, consisted of Allied and Axis operations in and around Italy, from 1943 to 1945. The joint Allied Forces Headquarters (AFHQ) was operationally responsible for all Allied land forces in the Mediterranean theatre and it planned and led the invasion of Sicily in July 1943, followed in September by the invasion of the Italian mainland and the campaign in Italy until the surrender of the German Armed Forces in Italy in May 1945.

It is estimated that between September 1943 and April 1945, 60,000–70,000 Allied and 38,805–150,660 German soldiers died in Italy. The number of Allied casualties was about 330,000 and the German figure (excluding those involved in the final surrender) was over 330,000. Fascist Italy, prior to its collapse, suffered about 200,000 casualties, mostly POWs taken in the invasion of Sicily, including more than 40,000 killed or missing. Over 150,000 Italian civilians died, as did 35,828 anti-fascist partisans and some 35,000 troops of the Italian Social Republic. On the Western Front of World War II, Italy was the most costly campaign in terms of casualties suffered by infantry forces of both sides, during bitter small-scale fighting around strongpoints at the Winter Line, the Anzio beachhead and the Gothic Line.

The invasion of Sicily in July 1943 led to the collapse of the Fascist Italian regime and the fall of Mussolini, who was deposed and arrested by order of King Victor Emmanuel III on 25 July. The new government signed an armistice with the Allies on 8 September 1943. However, German forces soon took control of northern and central Italy; Mussolini, who was rescued by German paratroopers, established a collaborationist puppet state, the Italian Social Republic (RSI), to administer the German-occupied territory. The Germans, sometimes with Italian fascists, also committed several atrocities against civilians and non-fascist troops. The Italian Co-Belligerent Army was created to fight against the RSI and its German allies, alongside the large Italian resistance movement, while other Italian troops continued to fight alongside the Germans in the National Republican Army; this period is known as the Italian Civil War. In April 1945, Mussolini was captured by the Italian resistance and summarily executed by firing squad. The campaign ended when Army Group C surrendered unconditionally to the Allies on May 2, 1945, one week before the formal German Instrument of Surrender. The independent states of San Marino and the Vatican, both surrounded by Italian territory, also suffered damage during the conflict.

Strategic background
Even before the victory in the North African campaign in May 1943, there was disagreement among the Allies on the best strategy to defeat the Axis. The British, especially the Prime Minister, Winston Churchill, advocated their traditional naval-based peripheral strategy. Even with a large army, but greater naval power, the traditional British answer against a continental enemy was to fight as part of a coalition and mount small peripheral operations designed to gradually weaken the enemy. The United States, with the larger U.S. Army, favoured a more direct method of fighting the main force of the German Army in northwestern Europe. The ability to launch such a campaign depended on first winning the Battle of the Atlantic.

The strategic disagreement was fierce, with the U.S. service chiefs arguing for an invasion of France as early as possible, while their British counterparts advocated a policy centred on operations in the Mediterranean. There was even pressure from some Latin American countries to stage an invasion of Spain, which, under Francisco Franco, was friendly to the Axis nations, although not a participant in the war. The American staff believed that a full-scale invasion of France at the earliest possible time was required to end the war in Europe, and that no operations should be undertaken that might delay that effort. The British argued that the presence of large numbers of troops trained for amphibious landings in the Mediterranean made a limited-scale invasion possible and useful.

Eventually the U.S. and British political leadership reached a compromise in which both would commit most of their forces to an invasion of France in early 1944, but also launch a relatively small-scale Italian campaign. A contributing factor was Franklin D. Roosevelt's desire to keep U.S. troops active in the European theatre during 1943 and his attraction to the idea of eliminating Italy from the war. It was hoped that an invasion might knock Italy out of the conflict, or at least increase the pressure on it and weaken it. The elimination of Italy would enable Allied naval forces, principally the Royal Navy, to dominate the Mediterranean Sea, securing the lines of communications with Egypt and thus Asia. Italian divisions on occupation and coastal defence duties in the Balkans and France would be withdrawn to defend Italy, while the Germans would have to transfer troops from the Eastern Front to defend Italy and the entire southern coast of France, thus aiding the Soviet Union.

Campaign

Invasion of Sicily

The initial plan was for landings in the south-east, south and north-west areas of the island which would lead to the rapid capture of key Axis airfields and except for Messina, all the main ports on the island. This would allow a rapid Allied build-up, as well as denying their use to the Axis. This was altered into a reduced number of landings but with more concentration of force.

The Allied invasion of Sicily , Operation Husky, began on 9 July 1943 with both amphibious and airborne landings at the Gulf of Gela. The land forces involved were the U.S. Seventh Army, under Lieutenant General George S. Patton, the 1st Canadian Infantry Division and the 1st Canadian Armoured Brigade under the command of Major-General Guy Simonds and the British Eighth Army, under General Bernard Montgomery.

The original plan required a strong advance by the British northwards along the east coast to Messina. The Canadians took the central position, with the British on their right and the Americans on the left.  The Canadian War Cemetery in Agira is testament to the sacrifice made driving the Germans from the rugged terrain.  The Americans had the important role of pushing Axis forces out of mainland Sicily on left flank.  When the Eighth Army were held up by stubborn defences in the rugged hills south of Mount Etna, Patton amplified the American role with a wide advance northwest toward Palermo and then directly north to cut the northern coastal road. This was followed by an eastward advance north of Etna towards Messina, supported by a series of amphibious landings on the northern coast that propelled Patton's troops into Messina shortly before the first units of the Eighth Army. The defending German and Italian forces were unable to prevent the Allied capture of the island, but they succeeded in evacuating most of their troops to the mainland, with the last leaving on 17 August 1943. The Allied forces gained experience in opposed amphibious operations, coalition warfare, and large airborne drops.

Invasion of mainland Italy

Forces of the British Eighth Army, still under Montgomery, landed in the 'toe' of Italy on 3 September 1943 in Operation Baytown, the day the Italian government agreed to an armistice with the Allies. The armistice was publicly announced on 8 September by two broadcasts, first by General Eisenhower and then by a proclamation by Marshal Badoglio. Although the German forces prepared to defend without Italian assistance, only two of their divisions opposite the Eighth Army and one at Salerno were not tied up disarming the Royal Italian Army.

On 9 September, forces of the U.S. Fifth Army, under Lieutenant General Mark W. Clark, expecting little resistance, landed against heavy German resistance at Salerno in Operation Avalanche; in addition, British forces landed at Taranto in Operation Slapstick, which was almost unopposed. There had been a hope that, with the surrender of the Italian government, the Germans would withdraw to the north, since at the time Adolf Hitler had been persuaded that Southern Italy was strategically unimportant. However, this was not to be; although, for a while, the Eighth Army was able to make relatively easy progress up the eastern coast, capturing the port of Bari and the important airfields around Foggia. Despite none of the northern reserves having been made available to the German 10th Army, it nevertheless came close to repelling the Salerno landing. The main Allied effort in the west initially centred on the port of Naples: that city was selected because it was the northernmost port that could receive air cover by fighter planes flying from Sicily. In the city itself, anti-Fascist Forces began an uprising, later known as the Four days of Naples, holding out despite continuous German reprisals until the arrival of Allied forces.

As the Allies advanced, they encountered increasingly difficult terrain: the Apennine Mountains form a spine along the Italian peninsula offset somewhat to the east. In the most mountainous areas of Abruzzo, more than half the width of the peninsula comprises crests and peaks over  that are relatively easy to defend; and the spurs and re-entrants to the spine confronted the Allies with a succession of ridges and rivers across their line of advance. The rivers were subject to sudden and unexpected flooding, which had the potential to thwart the Allied commanders' plans.

Allied advance on Rome

In early October 1943, Hitler was persuaded by his Army Group Commander in Southern Italy, Field Marshal Albert Kesselring, that the defence of Italy should be conducted as far away from Germany as possible. This would make the most of the natural defensive geography of Central Italy, whilst denying the Allies the easy capture of a succession of airfields, each one being ever closer to Germany. Hitler was also convinced that yielding southern Italy would provide the Allies with a springboard for an invasion of the Balkans, with its vital resources of oil, bauxite and copper.

Kesselring was given command of the whole of Italy and immediately ordered the preparation of a series of defensive lines across Italy, south of Rome. Two lines, the Volturno and the Barbara, were used to delay the Allied advance so as to buy time to prepare the most formidable defensive positions, which formed the Winter Line – the collective name for the Gustav Line and two associated defensive lines on the west of the Apennine Mountains, the Bernhardt and Hitler lines (the latter had been renamed the Senger Line by 23 May 1944).

The Winter Line proved a major obstacle to the Allies at the end of 1943, halting the Fifth Army's advance on the western side of Italy. Although the Gustav Line was penetrated on the Eighth Army's Adriatic front, and Ortona was liberated with heavy casualties to Canadian troops, the blizzards, drifting snow and zero visibility at the end of December caused the advance to grind to a halt. The Allies' focus then turned to the western front, where an attack through the Liri valley was considered to have the best chance of a breakthrough towards the Italian capital. Landings behind the line at Anzio during Operation Shingle, advocated by the British Prime Minister, Winston Churchill, were intended to destabilise the German Gustav line defences, but the early thrust inland to cut off the German defences did not occur because of disagreements that the American commander, Major General John P. Lucas, had with the battle plan, and his insistence that his forces were not large enough to accomplish their mission. Lucas entrenched his forces, during which time Kesselring assembled sufficient forces to form a ring around the beachhead. After a month of hard fighting, Lucas was replaced by Major General Lucian Truscott, who eventually broke out in May.

It took four major offensives between January and May 1944 before the line was eventually broken by a combined assault of the Fifth and Eighth Armies (including British, American, French, Polish, and Canadian corps) concentrated along a  front between Monte Cassino and the western seaboard. In a concurrent action,  General Mark Clark was ordered to break out of the stagnant position at Anzio and cash in on the opportunity to cut off and destroy a large part of the German 10th Army retreating from the Gustav Line between them and the Canadians. But this opportunity was lost on the brink of success, when Clark disobeyed his orders and sent his U.S. forces to enter the vacant Rome instead. Rome had been declared an open city by the German Army so no resistance was encountered.

The American forces took possession of Rome on 4 June 1944. The German 10th Army were allowed to get away and, in the next few weeks, may have been responsible for doubling the Allied casualties in the next few months. Clark was hailed as a hero in the United States though postwar assessments have been critical of his command decisions.

Allied advance into Northern Italy

After the capture of Rome, and the Allied invasion of Normandy in June, the U.S. VI Corps and the French Expeditionary Corps (CEF), which together amounted to seven divisions, were pulled out of Italy during the summer of 1944 to participate in Operation Dragoon, codename for the Allied invasion of Southern France. The sudden removal of these experienced units from the Italian front was only partially compensated for by the gradual arrival of three divisions, the Brazilian 1st Infantry Division, the U.S. 92nd Infantry Division, both in the second half of 1944, and the U.S. 10th Mountain Division in January 1945.

In the period from June to August 1944, the Allies advanced beyond Rome, taking Florence and closing up on the Gothic Line. In order to shorten the Allied lines of communication for the advance into Northern Italy, the Polish II Corps advanced towards the port of Ancona and, after a month-long battle, succeeded in capturing it on 18 July.

During Operation Olive, which commenced on 25 August, the Gothic Line defences were penetrated on both the Fifth and Eighth Army fronts; but, there was no decisive breakthrough. Churchill, the British Prime Minister, had hoped that a major advance in late 1944 would open the way for the Allied armies to advance northeast through the "Ljubljana Gap" (the area between Venice and Vienna, which is today's Slovenia) to Vienna and Hungary to forestall the Red Army from advancing into Eastern Europe. Churchill's proposal had been strongly opposed by the U.S. Chiefs of Staff as, despite its importance to British postwar interests in the region, they did not believe that it aligned with overall Allied war priorities.

In October, Lieutenant General Sir Richard McCreery succeeded Lieutenant General Sir Oliver Leese as the commander of the Eighth Army. In December, Lieutenant General Mark Clark, the Fifth Army commander, was appointed to command the 15th Army Group, thereby succeeding the British General Sir Harold Alexander as commander of all Allied ground troops in Italy; Alexander succeeded Field Marshal Sir Henry Wilson as the Supreme Allied Commander in the Mediterranean Theatre. Clark was succeeded in command of the Fifth Army by Lieutenant General Lucian K. Truscott Jr. In the winter and spring of 1944–45, extensive partisan activity in Northern Italy took place. As there were two Italian governments during this period, (one on each side of the war), the struggle took on some characteristics of a civil war.

The poor winter weather, which made armoured manoeuvre and the exploitation of overwhelming air superiority impossible, coupled with the massive losses suffered to its ranks during the autumn fighting, the need to transfer some British troops to Greece (as well as the need to withdraw the British 5th Infantry Division and I Canadian Corps to northwestern Europe) made it impractical for the Allies to continue their offensive in early 1945. Instead, the Allies adopted a strategy of "offensive defence" while preparing for a final attack when better weather and ground conditions arrived in the spring.

In late February-early March 1945, Operation Encore saw elements of the U.S. IV Corps (1st Brazilian Division and the newly arrived U.S. 10th Mountain Division) battling forward across minefields in the Apennines to align their front with that of the U.S. II Corps on their right. They pushed the German defenders from the commanding high point of Monte Castello and the adjacent Monte Belvedere and Castelnuovo, depriving them of artillery positions that had been commanding the approaches to Bologna since the narrowly failed Allied attempt to take the city in the autumn. Meanwhile, damage to other transport infrastructure forced Axis forces to use sea, canal and river routes for re-supply, leading to Operation Bowler against shipping in Venice harbour on 21 March 1945.

The Allies' final offensive commenced with massive aerial and artillery bombardments on 9 April 1945. The Allies had 1,500,000 men and women deployed in Italy in April 1945. The Axis on 7 April had 599,404 troops of which 439,224 were Germans and 160,180 were Italians. By 18 April, Eighth Army forces in the east had broken through the Argenta Gap and sent armour racing forward in an encircling move to meet the U.S. IV Corps advancing from the Apennines in Central Italy and to trap the remaining defenders of Bologna. On 21 April, Bologna was entered by the 3rd Carpathian Division, the Italian Friuli Group (both from the Eighth Army) and the U.S. 34th Infantry Division (from the Fifth Army). The U.S. 10th Mountain Division, which had bypassed Bologna, reached the River Po on 22 April; the 8th Indian Infantry Division, on the Eighth Army front, reached the river on 23 April.

By 25 April, the Italian Partisans' Committee of Liberation declared a general uprising, and on the same day, having crossed the Po on the right flank, forces of the Eighth Army advanced north-northeast towards Venice and Trieste. On the front of the U.S. Fifth Army, divisions drove north toward Austria and northwest to Milan. On the Fifth Army's left flank, the U.S. 92nd Infantry Division (the "Buffalo Soldiers Division") went along the coast to Genoa. A rapid advance towards Turin by the Brazilian division on their right took the German–Italian Army of Liguria by surprise, causing its collapse.

Between 26 April and 1 May there were the Battles of Collecchio-Fornovo di Taro, which resulted in the surrender of the 148th German Infantry Division to Brazilian soldiers of the FEB; the Brazilian soldiers captured about 15,000 Italian and Nazi soldiers, the end of these battles marked the end of the conflicts in Italy and the end of the Italian fascist army.

As April 1945 came to an end, the German Army Group C, retreating on all fronts and having lost most of its fighting strength, was left with little option but surrender. General Heinrich von Vietinghoff, who had taken command of Army Group C after Albert Kesselring had been transferred to become Commander-in-Chief of the Western Front (OB West) in March 1945, signed the instrument of surrender on behalf of the German armies in Italy on 29 April, formally bringing hostilities to an end on 2 May 1945.

Progress of the campaign

War crimes

Axis crimes 

Research in 2016 funded by the German government found the number of victims of Nazi war crimes in Italy to be 22,000. The victims were primarily Italian civilians, sometimes in retaliation for partisan attacks, and Italian Jews.

Approximately 14,000 Italian non-Jewish civilians, often women, children and elderly, have been documented to have died in over 5,300 individual instances of war crimes committed by Nazi Germany. The largest of those was the Marzabotto massacre, where in excess of 770 civilians were murdered. The Sant'Anna di Stazzema massacre saw 560 civilians killed while the Ardeatine massacre saw 335 randomly selected people executed, among them 75 Italian Jews. In the Padule di Fucecchio massacre up to 184 civilians were executed.

Allied crimes

Allied war crimes during the conflict were reported, including killing of civilians (such as the Canicattì massacre), execution of prisoners (such as two massacres at Biscari airfield on 14 July 1943), and rape (most notably the marocchinate).

See also

 Italian front (World War I)
 Liberation of France
 Military history of Italy during World War II
 Italian Co-Belligerent Army
 Italian Co-Belligerent Navy
 Italian Co-Belligerent Air Force
 Italian Social Republic
 Italian resistance movement
 Italian Civil War

Notes
Footnotes

Citations

References

Further reading

External links

 
 Winter Line Stories Original stories from the front lines of the Italian campaign by US Army Liaison Officer Major Ralph R. Hotchkiss
 World War II
 Ortona and the Italian campaign – 65th Anniversary
 Canadians in Italy, 1943–1945   Media, photos and information on Canadians in the Italian theatre.
 Brazilian WWII Veterans website 
 Brazilian Expeditionary Force Website   with histories, biographies, photos, and videos on the Italian campaign.
 New Zealand Official War History Italy volume I: From The Sangro to Cassino, Italy Volume II: From Cassino to Trieste
 Memoirs of Lt-Col Donald, NZEF (Italy, Chapters 8–15)
 Dal Volturno a Cassino, website (in Italian) covering the autumn /winter of 1943 – 44
 World War II propaganda leaflets – use in Italy : A website about airdropped, artillery-delivered or rocket-fired propaganda leaflets. Italian campaign.
 BBC's flash video of the Italian campaign
 Canadian Newspapers and the Second World War – The Sicilian and Italian Campaigns, 1943–1945
 Liberatori: A website on the Po river breakout and the liberation of the small town of Cornuda.
 Royal Engineers Museum Royal Engineers and Second World War (Italian Campaign)
 CBC Digital Archives – The Italian Campaign
  La Città Invisibile Collection of signs, stories and memories during the Gothic Line age.
  Italian Partisan Collection of stories and memories from Italian partisan.
 Italy Volume I, The Sangro to Cassino the New Zealand Official War History
 Italy Volume II, From Cassino to Trieste the New Zealand Official War History
 Canada and the Italian campaign

 
Battles and operations of World War II involving Brazil
Battles and operations of World War II involving Canada
Military history of Canada during World War II
Battles and operations of World War II involving France
Battles and operations of World War II involving Greece
Battles and operations of World War II involving India
Battles and operations of World War II involving Italy
Battles and operations of World War II involving Poland
Battles and operations of World War II involving New Zealand
Battles and operations of World War II involving South Africa
Battles and operations of World War II involving the United States
Battles and operations of World War II involving Australia
Modern history of Italy
World War II campaigns of the Mediterranean Theatre
Campaigns, operations and battles of World War II involving the United Kingdom